The Kingston Range, sometimes called the Kingston Mountains, is located in Inyo and San Bernardino counties in the Mojave Desert in eastern California.

The range is located southeast of the Nopah Range, and north of the Shadow Mountains and Interstate 15.

Wilderness
The Kingston Range Wilderness was added to the National Wilderness Preservation System by the U.S. Congress in 1994 and is currently composed of 252,149 acres in three distinct units separated by non-wilderness corridors. This area protects an ecological transition zone between the Great Basin and Mojave Deserts.

The Amargosa unit in the north is centered around Amargosa Canyon and protects a desert wetland habitat that supports a diverse population of migratory birds and aquatic life. The central Kingston unit encompasses the Kingston Mountains themselves, a 17-mile ridgeline that rises to 7,323 on Kingston Peak. The southern Shadow Mountain unit covers the lower elevation Shadow Mountains.

There are 505 native plant species in the wilderness area. From Creosote bush scrub vegetation in the lower elevations to juniper-pinyon woodland at higher elevations, this desert wilderness includes a wealth of botanical biodiversity including the only stand of Giant nolina in the eastern Mojave Desert as well as a relic stand of white fir trees clinging to the slopes of two drainages just below Kingston Peak. Wildlife includes  the banded gila monster, bighorn sheep, wild burros, coyote, black-tailed jackrabbits, ground squirrels, kangaroo rats, roadrunners, quail, rattlesnakes, tarantulas, several species of lizards, and the desert tortoise.

See also
Kingston Peak

References

California Road and Recreation Atlas, 2005, pg.97

Mountain ranges of Southern California
Mountain ranges of the Mojave Desert
Mountain ranges of San Bernardino County, California